Hir (also Romanized as Hīr) is a city in Hir District of Ardabil County, Ardabil province, Iran. At the 2006 census, its population was 2,588 in 663 households. The following census in 2011 counted 2,521 people in 719 households. The latest census in 2016 showed a population of 2,080 people in 681 households.

References 

Ardabil County

Cities in Ardabil Province

Populated places in Ardabil Province

Populated places in Ardabil County